Ardbrin is a townland of 1,007 acres in County Down, Northern Ireland. It is situated in the civil parish of Annaclone and the historic barony of Iveagh Upper, Upper Half.

It is the largest townland in the parish and contains a cemetery marking the site of the ancient parish church. The townland contains part of the village of Annaclone, the remainder being in the townland of Tullintanvally.

Archaeology
An Iron Age bronze trumpet, known as the 'Ardbrin Horn', was found in bogland at Ardbrin in the 19th century. The horn is 1.42m long and made from riveted and shaped bronze sheets, including 1,094 rivets. It may have been an instrument for display and use on special occasions. It is held in the National Museum of Ireland in Dublin.

See also
List of townlands in County Down
List of archaeological sites in County Down

References

Townlands of County Down
Civil parish of Annaclone
Archaeological sites in County Down